The Buccaneer is a 1938 American adventure film made by Paramount Pictures starring Fredric March and based on Jean Lafitte and the Battle of New Orleans during the War of 1812. The picture was produced and directed by Cecil B. DeMille from a screenplay by Harold Lamb, Edwin Justus Mayer and C. Gardner Sullivan adapted by Jeanie MacPherson from the 1930 novel Lafitte the Pirate by Lyle Saxon. The music score was by George Antheil and the cinematography by Victor Milner.

The film stars Fredric March as Lafitte, Franciska Gaal and Akim Tamiroff with Margot Grahame, Walter Brennan, Ian Keith, Spring Byington, Douglass Dumbrille, Beulah Bondi and Anthony Quinn in supporting roles.

It is one of the few pre-1950 sound films by Paramount to remain under that studio's ownership (partly so the remake could be filmed), whereas most films from that era had been sold to EMKA, Ltd. (now part of NBCUniversal Television Distribution) in the early television era.

Cecil B. DeMille remade the film in 1958 in Technicolor and VistaVision with the same title, but because of ill health, he allowed Henry Wilcoxon, his longtime friend and associate, to produce it, and the film was directed by Anthony Quinn, who was his son-in-law at the time. DeMille received no screen credit, but did make a personal appearance in the prologue to the film, much as he did in The Ten Commandments two years prior. The 1958 version of The Buccaneer stars Yul Brynner, Charles Boyer and Claire Bloom, with Charlton Heston as Andrew Jackson. Douglass Dumbrille appeared in both versions and Quinn acted in the earlier version.

Plot
In the closing stages of the War of 1812, Dolly Madison (Spring Byington) evacuates the White House as the British Army arrives and burn Washington. Jean Lafitte (Fredric March) asks a young woman of good family, Annette de Remy (Margot Grahame), to marry him but she asks him to give up his piracy first. He and his pirates set up a trading post in Louisiana in the swamp to sell luxury goods to New Orleans society that they have seized from foreign ships but have to suspend their sales when the governor, Ferdinand Claiborne, who has put a bounty on his head, appears with troops. Senator Crawford (Ian Keith) tells him that the British will offer him money to help them. Laffite leaves for the sea where he finds one of his captains, Captain Brown (Robert Barrat) has seized the Corinthian, an American ship, contrary to his orders not to attack American ships, burning the ship and killing the crew and passengers. Laffite's man Dominique You (Akim Tamiroff) saves the sole survivor Gretchen (Franciska Gaal), who had been made to walk the plank by Brown so no witnesses remained, and Lafitte hangs the captain for disobeying orders. Lafitte spares Gretchen despite her potential as a hostile witness and Gretchen works as his maid and falls in love with him, despite You being in love with her. The British, who are planning to attack New Orleans, offer Laffitte position and wealth if he will guide them through the swamps to the city and threaten to attack his stronghold if he will not. Although his men are willing, Lafitte's loyalty is to Louisiana and he delays answering the British, instead warning the city authorities of the British plans. On Crawford's advice, Brevet Major General Andrew Jackson (Hugh Sothern), who leads the available American forces,  does not trust Lafitte and instead attacks his stronghold in order to prevent him aiding the English, capturing or killing his men, whom Lafitte has ordered not to resist. Meanwhile, Jackson determines to defend the city, though he has limited forces, despite Crawford's advice to surrender the city. Lafitte, who escaped from the attack, perseveres, appearing before Jackson in person and offering to supply him with flints and powder and provide experienced gunners to help defend the city if he will pardon his men. Jackson agrees to grant pardon after the forthcoming battle, although he will only promise to give Lafitte an hour's start from pursuit. Lafitte releases his men, in the process killing Crawford in a sword fight.

The entrenched American forces, with the help of Lafitte's artillery and gunners, mow down the advancing ranks of disciplined but over confident British troops. At the victory ball, Gretchen is recognized as a passenger on the Corinthian and as wearing clothing and jewels from Annette's sister, who was a passenger on the ship. It is consequently revealed that Lafitte's men had sunk it, killing Annette's sister along with the other passengers and crew. Lafitte accepts ultimate responsibility for the tragedy and is only saved from a lynching by Jackson, who keeps his promise of giving Lafitte an hour's start. With Annette heartbroken, Lafitte leaves, reaching his ship safely, where he finds that Gretchen has stowed away.

Cast
 Fredric March as Jean Lafitte
 Franciska Gaal as Gretchen
 Akim Tamiroff as Dominique You
 Margot Grahame as Annette de Remy
 Walter Brennan as Ezra Peavey
 Ian Keith as Senator Crawford
 Spring Byington as Dolly Madison
 Douglass Dumbrille as Governor Claiborne
 Robert Barrat as Captain Brown
 Hugh Sothern as Andrew Jackson
 John Rogers as Mouse
 Beulah Bondi as Aunt Charlotte
 Anthony Quinn as Beluche
 Louise Campbell as Marie de Remy
 Montagu Love as Admiral Cockburn
 Eric Stanley as General Ross
 Fred Kohler as Gramby
 Gilbert Emery as Captain Lockyer
 Holmes Herbert as Captain McWilliams
 Evelyn Keyes as Madeleine
 Francis McDonald as Camden Blount
 Frank Melton as Lieutenant Shreve 
 Stanley Andrews as Collector of Port pirate
 Jack Hubbard as Charles 
 Richard Denning as Captain Reid

Reference in another film 

The 1975 film The Day of the Locust used a fictionalized version of The Buccaneer's Hollywood premiere for its climactic finale.

References

External links 
 
 
 

1938 films
1938 adventure films
American swashbuckler films
Paramount Pictures films
Films directed by Cecil B. DeMille
Films scored by George Antheil
Films shot in New Orleans
Films set in New Orleans
Pirate films
War of 1812 films
American films based on actual events
American folklore films and television series
American black-and-white films
Films set in 1815
Films about Andrew Jackson
Cultural depictions of Andrew Jackson
Cultural depictions of Jean Lafitte
American adventure films
1930s English-language films
1930s American films